Tobias Werner (born 19 July 1985) is a German former professional footballer who played as a left midfielder or winger.

Career
On 3 August 2016, Werner moved to VfB Stuttgart. On 28 August 2017, he was loaned out to 1. FC Nürnberg until the end of the season. After the end of the loan deal, Werner joined VfB Stuttgart II.

In March 2019, Werner announced his retirement, "mostly due to health issues" having agreed the early termination of his contract until 2019.

References

External links
 
 

1985 births
Living people
Association football midfielders
Association football wingers
German footballers
FC Carl Zeiss Jena players
FC Augsburg players
VfB Stuttgart players
1. FC Nürnberg players
VfB Stuttgart II players
Bundesliga players
2. Bundesliga players
Sportspeople from Gera
Footballers from Thuringia